Vassobia is a genus of flowering plants belonging to the family Solanaceae.

Its native range is South America.

Species:
 Vassobia breviflora (Sendtn.) Hunz. 
 Vassobia dichotoma (Rusby) Bitter

References

Physaleae
Solanaceae genera